Plymouth Meeting Historic District  is a national historic district that straddles Plymouth and Whitemarsh Townships in Montgomery County, Pennsylvania, United States. The adjacent Cold Point Historic District is north of it.

The district encompasses 200 acres (81 ha) and includes 56 contributing buildings in the historic core of Plymouth Meeting. Among these are the separately-listed Plymouth Friends Meetinghouse (1708); Hinterleiter House (1714); Livezey House and Store (1740–1788); Hovenden House, Barn and Abolition Hall (1795, 1856); and Plymouth Meeting Country Store and Post Office (1827).

The district was added to the National Register of Historic Places in 1971.

Plymouth Meeting House is the name of a village situated at the intersection of the Plymouth and Perkiomen turnpikes, on the township line.  On this [Plymouth] side is the meeting house, school house and four houses; and in Whitemarsh two stores, a blacksmith and wheelwright shop, post office and twenty-four houses. The houses in this village are chiefly situated along the Perkiomen or Reading pike, nearly adjoining one another, and being of stone, neatly white washed, with shady yards in front, present to the stranger an agreeable appearance. In the basement of the Library building the Methodists hold worship. This is an ancient settlement, whose history dates back nearly to the arrival of William Penn, and is marked as a village on Lewis Evans' map of 1749. The post office was established here before 1827. In 1832 there were but ten houses here. — History of Montgomery County (1858).

Contributing properties (alphabetical by street)
Separately NRHP-listed properties are shaded in blue.

References

Historic districts on the National Register of Historic Places in Pennsylvania
Historic districts in Montgomery County, Pennsylvania
National Register of Historic Places in Montgomery County, Pennsylvania
Plymouth Meeting, Pennsylvania